Pempudu Koothuru is a 1963 Indian Telugu-language drama film, produced and directed by B. R. Panthulu. It stars N. T. Rama Rao, Sowcar Janaki, and Devika with music composed by T. G. Lingappa. The film was simultaneously made in Kannada as Saaku Magalu by the same banner and director.

Plot 
Raghu (N. T. Rama Rao) a vagabond, who always spends most of his time in playing cards, horse races, etc. and his father Tirupathi (Ramana Reddy) accompanies him. Uma (Devika), his foster sister who works as a school teacher preserves the family. In the same town, a rich man Dasavataram (Relangi) leads a happy family life with his wife & two children Vasu (Haranath) and Manjula (Sowcar Janaki). Once Manjula insults Raghu thereupon, clashes arise between them, ahead, Vasu gets acquaintance with Uma and both of them fall in love. Everyone agrees to their marriage, but when Manjula finds out Raghu as Uma's brother, she refuses the proposal. So, Uma decides to leave the house when her mother Seetamma (Malathi) claims herself as an orphan, then Uma promises to be unmarried until her father & brother are reformed. Thereafter, Tirupathi fixes Uma's alliance with an old rich man Simhachalam. Here Raghu understands his sister's virtue, transforms himself as a renew and succeeds in performing Uma marriage with Vasu. Afterward, Vasu leaves abroad, at that time, a tragedy happens, Manjula loses her eyesight due to the Uma's fault when everyone indicts her. Now to protect his sister's grace Raghu marries Manjula by dramatizing himself as a dumb person. Soon after, the truth comes forward when Manjula tries to commit suicide, scrutinizing the situation Raghu quits and Uma is discarded from the house in spite of being pregnant. After that, Manjula is taken to Bangalore for treatment where Raghu also lands and starts serving his wife without giving his identity. Parallelly, Uma is rescued by an old man and she gives birth to a baby boy. Manjula also gets back her sight and realizes her mistake after knowing the fact and moves for Raghu. At the same time, Raghu rescues Uma's child from an accident and meets her, Vasu also returns from abroad. Finally, the movie ends on a happy note with the reunion of the entire family.

Cast 
N. T. Rama Rao as Raghu
Sowcar Janaki as Manjula
Devika as Uma
Haranath as Vaasu
Relangi as Dasavataram R
Ramana Reddy as Tirupati
Balakrishna as Shankaram
Malathi as Seetamma
Kutty Padmini
Y. V. Raju
Lanka Satyam as Simhachalam

Soundtrack 

Music composed by T. G. Lingappa.

References

External links 
 

Indian drama films
Indian multilingual films
Films directed by B. R. Panthulu
Films scored by T. G. Lingappa
1960s multilingual films